Stephen Henry Jones  (born 4 August 1955) is a Welsh athlete and set the former world record in the marathon, in his first completed race at that distance at the Chicago Marathon in 1984 with 2:08:05.

Biography
Jones grew up in Ebbw Vale, Wales and ran his first race at the age of 15 as a member of the Air Training Corps. Dissatisfied with working in a factory as a sewing-machine mechanic, he became an aircraft technician for the Royal Air Force (RAF) in 1974, and joined the RAF's running team in 1976. After receiving an invitation to the 1983 Chicago Marathon Jones began training for that distance; he previously had specialized in the 5,000 and 10,000 m, and on 6 Aug 1984, he ran the 1984 Olympic 10,000 m event. He finished 8th with a time of 28:28.08.

On 21 Oct 1984, a year after he had dropped out of the Chicago Marathon because of injury, Jones won the event—his first completed marathon—with a time of 2:08:05, breaking the world record of Australian Robert de Castella by 13 seconds. Jones was unaware of the record and, since he never wore a watch, did not know that he might break it until two miles before the finish. He won the 1985 London Marathon in 2:08:16 despite stopping to go to the toilet during the event; Jones later said, "I didn't even train for [the race]", instead continuing to coach himself. Aware that he was "one hamstring tear away from oblivion", Jones remained with the RAF despite earning large sums per race. In August 1985, he broke the world record for the half marathon, running 61:14 in Birmingham.  On 20 October of that year he achieved his personal best marathon time of 2:07:13 in winning the Chicago Marathon, only one second slower than the world record run by Carlos Lopes at the Rotterdam Marathon earlier that same year. This time was the fastest of any British runner for 33 years until Mo Farah beat it in 2018.

In 1986, he won a bronze medal in the 10,000 m at the Commonwealth Games. In the European Championships shortly after, he once again competed in the marathon. Leading from the start and breaking away from the pack, Jones ran a brilliant race up to the 20-mile mark. At that point he was leading by over two minutes and on schedule for another world record. However, he then "hit the wall" and suffered terribly in the final six miles. He slowed to a virtual shuffle, but refused to quit as he watched other competitors catch and pass him. Two years later, in the 1988 New York City Marathon, Jones won by over three minutes with a time of 2:08:20.

He was the first Welsh athlete to appear on the cover of the prestigious running magazine Running Times.

Jones was appointed a Member of the Order of the British Empire (MBE) in the 2019 Birthday Honours for services to sport.

Jones lives in Boulder, Colorado.

Achievements

Popular culture
In 2010, a video went viral featuring the Welshman's dramatic, tenacious finish to outrun the Tanzanian runner Gidamis Shahanga in the closing 80 metres of a 10000 metres race after being got caught with 110 metres remaining. Due to the vivid commentary the video is often featured in videos of "inspirational sports moments" or "remarkable comebacks".

In the race, Jones was leading from the start with 30 metres margins up until the last 400 metres, at which point the commentary (from David Coleman) noted "But they are closing. And of course he (Jones) got very little finishing speed". Then Shahanga closed in rapidly. With 200 metres remaining, Jones glimpsed back and saw Shahanga, with the commentary famously noted, "Jones' looking for trouble and the trouble is there". Shahanga caught Jones with 110 metres remaining, when commentary noted "the African is going to steal the race in the last 80 metres", yet as soon the comment is made, Jones managed to comeback, accelerate and win the race with the time 27:55.2s. This 10000-meter run was an invitational race held in Memorial Van Damme Stadium, Brussels, 1983, hence not recognised in official competitive records.

References

 
 Runners World
 The Independent Bio

1955 births
Living people
Sportspeople from Ebbw Vale
Sportspeople from Boulder, Colorado
Welsh male long-distance runners
Welsh male marathon runners
Welsh male cross country runners
Olympic athletes of Great Britain
Athletes (track and field) at the 1984 Summer Olympics
Commonwealth Games bronze medallists for Wales
Commonwealth Games medallists in athletics
Athletes (track and field) at the 1978 Commonwealth Games
Athletes (track and field) at the 1982 Commonwealth Games
Athletes (track and field) at the 1986 Commonwealth Games
Athletes (track and field) at the 1990 Commonwealth Games
World Athletics Championships athletes for Great Britain
Chicago Marathon male winners
London Marathon male winners
New York City Marathon male winners
World record setters in athletics (track and field)
Members of the Order of the British Empire
Medallists at the 1986 Commonwealth Games